B-flat or B may refer to:

 B (musical note)
 B major
 B minor
 b-flat Acoustic Music & Jazzclub, Berlin, Germany